Clarkinella is a genus of braconid wasps in the family Braconidae. There are at least two described species in Clarkinella.

Species
These two species belong to the genus Clarkinella:
 Clarkinella canadensis Mason, 1981 (Canada)
 Clarkinella edithae Mason, 1981 (Brazil, Trinidad & Tobago)

References

Further reading

 
 
 

Microgastrinae